The European Qualifications Framework (EQF) acts as a translation device to make national qualifications more readable across Europe, promoting workers' and learners' mobility between countries and facilitating their lifelong learning. The EQF aims to relate different countries' national qualifications systems to a common European reference framework. Individuals and employers will be able to use the EQF to better understand and compare the qualifications levels of different countries and different education and training systems. Since 2012, all new qualifications issued in Europe carry a reference to an appropriate EQF level.

Structure 
The core of the EQF concerns eight reference levels describing what a learner knows, understands and is able to do – 'learning outcomes'. Levels of national qualifications will be placed at one of the central reference levels, ranging from basic (Level 1) to advanced (Level 8). This will enable a much easier comparison between national qualifications and should also mean that people do not have to repeat their learning if they move to another country. To compare EQF in different countries https://europa.eu/europass/en/compare-qualifications.

Notes to the table:

Scope
The EQF applies to all types of education, training and qualifications, from school education to academic, professional and vocational. This approach shifts the focus from the traditional system which emphasises 'learning inputs', such as the length of a learning experience, or type of institution. It also encourages lifelong learning by promoting the validation of non-formal and informal learning.

This reflects a wider shift within which the EQF is acting as a catalyst for reforms: most Member States are now developing their own National Qualifications Frameworks (NQFs) based on learning outcomes. Several countries (IE, MT, UK, FR and BE-Flanders) already have one in force.

At present, an enterprise in France may hesitate to recruit a job applicant from, say, Sweden, because it does not understand the level of the qualifications presented by the Swedish candidate. But once the EQF is fully implemented, a Swedish person's certificates will bear a reference to an EQF reference level. The French authorities will have already decided where their own national certificates in the field concerned lie, so the French enterprise would use the EQF reference to get a better idea of how the Swedish qualification compares to French qualifications.

See also
 International Standard Classification of Education (ISCED) for a similar international level system

References

External links
 Portal dedicated to the implementation of the European Qualifications Framework for lifelong learning
 euVETsupport: a support portal for the application of EQF and ECVET in praxis
 An exemplary practical application of the EQF in the framework of the European professional driver qualification (ProfDRV)
European Qualifications Framework (EQF) - Official position of the board of the Federal Institute for Vocational Education and Training

Qualifications
Educational policies and initiatives of the European Union